The 1991 ATP Tour World Championships was the men's tennis season-ending tournament. The singles event was also known as the IBM ATP Tour World Championships and was played on indoor carpet courts at the Festhalle Frankfurt in Germany. The doubles event, also known as the Standard Bank ATP Tour World Doubles Final, was played on indoor hard courts in held in Johannesburg, South Africa. Both competitions were held between 12 November and 17 November 1991. Sixth-seeded Pete Sampras won the singles title and John Fitzgerald with Anders Järryd won the doubles title.

Finals

Singles

 Pete Sampras defeated  Jim Courier, 3–6, 7–6(7–5), 6–3, 6–4

Doubles

 John Fitzgerald /  Anders Järryd defeated  Ken Flach /  Robert Seguso 6–4, 6–4, 2–6, 6–4.

References

 
Tennis tournaments in Germany
ATP Finals
1991 ATP Tour
Tennis tournaments in South Africa
1991 in German tennis
Sports competitions in Frankfurt
1991 in South African tennis
Sports competitions in Johannesburg
1990s in Frankfurt
1990s in Johannesburg
November 1991 sports events in Europe